Drakkar Don Klose (born March 9, 1988) is an American mixed martial artist currently competing in the Lightweight division of the Ultimate Fighting Championship.

Background
Born and raised alongside six other siblings in South Haven, Michigan, Klose had a standout wrestling career at South Haven High School, winning a state championship in 2005. He continued his career at North Idaho College before transferring to Lindenwood University for his junior year. After being kicked out of college, he relocated to Arizona in hopes of enhancing his mixed martial arts career.

Mixed martial arts career

Early career
Klose begun his career as an amateur racking a 7–0 record. Prior to joining the UFC, Klose amassed a record of 7–0–1 in organizations such as Resurrection Fighting Alliance and World Fighting Federation.

Klose signed with the UFC in late 2016.

Ultimate Fighting Championship
Klose made his promotional debut on January 15, 2017, at UFC Fight Night 103 against fellow newcomer Devin Powell. He won the fight via unanimous decision.

Klose faced Marc Diakiese on July 7, 2017, at The Ultimate Fighter 25 Finale. He won the fight by split decision, after dropping his opponent with leg kicks in both the first and second round.

Klose faced David Teymur on December 2, 2017, at UFC 218. He lost the bout via unanimous decision.

Klose faced Lando Vannata on July 7, 2018, at UFC 226. He won the fight via unanimous decision.

Klose faced Bobby Green on December 15, 2018, at UFC on Fox 31 He won the fight by unanimous decision.

Klose was expected to face Beneil Dariush on July 13, 2019, at UFC Fight Night 155.  However, on July 7, Dariush pulled out of the fight with an injury. As a result, UFC officials opted to remove Klose from the card and he is expected to be scheduled for a future event instead.

Klose faced Christos Giagos on August 17, 2019, at UFC 241. He won the back-and-forth fight via unanimous decision.

Klose next faced Beneil Dariush on March 7, 2020, at UFC 248, a rescheduling of the bout that was canceled in July 2019. He lost the fight via knockout in the second round.

Klose was scheduled to face Jai Herbert on February 20, 2021, at UFC Fight Night 185. However, Herbert pulled out in the weeks leading up to the event and was replaced by Luis Peña. However, the bout was cancelled after Klose's corner tested positive for COVID-19.

Klose was expected to face Jeremy Stephens at UFC on ESPN 22 on April 17, 2021. However, day of the event, it was announced that the bout was scrapped due to Klose sustaining a spinal injury as a result of being shoved by Stephens at the weigh-ins. Despite the fight not happening, it was reported that Klose would receive his show money and compliance pay.

After two-year absence from the octagon, Klose was scheduled to face Nikolas Motta on April 16, 2022, at UFC on ESPN 34. However, Motta was removed from the event for undisclosed reason and he was replaced by Brandon Jenkins. Klose won the fight via technical knockout in round two after knocking Jenkins down multiple times. This win earned him the Performance of the Night award.

Klose was scheduled to face Carlos Diego Ferreira on July 30, 2022, at UFC 277.  However, Ferreira was forced out the event due an injury and he was replaced by Rafa García. Klose won the fight by unanimous decision.

Klose is scheduled to face Mark Madsen  on October 29, 2022, at UFC Fight Night 213. However, Klose pulled out in mid-October due to an anterior cruciate ligament injury.

Personal life
Klose has a son, Kingston (born 2018). He is married to fellow UFC athlete Cortney Casey.

Championships and accomplishments
Ultimate Fighting Championship
Performance of the Night (One time) 
Rage in the Cage
RITC Lightweight Championship (one time; former)

Mixed martial arts record

|-
|Win
|align=center|13–2–1
|Rafa García
|Decision (unanimous)
|UFC 277
|
|align=center|3
|align=center|5:00
|Dallas, Texas, United States
|
|-
|Win
|align=center|12–2–1
|Brandon Jenkins
|TKO (punches)
|UFC on ESPN: Luque vs. Muhammad 2 
|
|align=center|2
|align=center|0:33
|Las Vegas, Nevada, United States
|
|- 
|Loss
|align=center|11–2–1
|Beneil Dariush
|KO (punch)
|UFC 248
|
|align=center|2
|align=center|1:00
|Las Vegas, Nevada, United States
|
|-
|Win
|align=center|11–1–1
|Christos Giagos
|Decision (unanimous)
|UFC 241 
|
|align=center|3
|align=center|5:00
|Anaheim, California, United States
| 
|-
|Win
|align=center|
|Bobby Green
|Decision (unanimous)
|UFC on Fox: Lee vs. Iaquinta 2
|
|align=center|3
|align=center|5:00
|Milwaukee, Wisconsin, United States
|
|-
|Win
|align=center|9–1–1
|Lando Vannata
|Decision (unanimous)
|UFC 226 
|
|align=center|3
|align=center|5:00
|Las Vegas, Nevada, United States
|
|-
|Loss
|align=center|8–1–1
|David Teymur
|Decision (unanimous) 
|UFC 218 
|
|align=center|3
|align=center|5:00
|Detroit, Michigan, United States
|
|-
|Win
|align=center|8–0–1
|Marc Diakiese
|Decision (split)
|The Ultimate Fighter: Redemption Finale
|
|align=center|3
|align=center|5:00
|Las Vegas, Nevada, United States
|
|-
|Win
|align=center| 7–0–1
|Devin Powell
|Decision (unanimous)
|UFC Fight Night: Rodríguez vs. Penn
|
|align=center|3
|align=center|5:00
|Phoenix, Arizona, United States
|
|-
|Win
|align=center| 6–0–1
|Hugh Pulley
|Decision (unanimous)
|RFA 44
|
|align=center|3
|align=center|5:00
|St. Charles, Missouri, United States
|
|-
|Draw
|align=center|5–0–1
|Joshua Avales
|Draw (split)
|Tachi Palace Fights 26
|
|align=center|3
|align=center|5:00
|Lemoore, California, United States
|
|-
|Win
|align=center|5–0
|Alejandro Garcia
|TKO (punches)
|World Fighting Federation 23
|
|align=center|2
|align=center|4:08
|Chandler, Arizona, United States
|
|-
|Win
|align=center|4–0
|Gabe Rodriguez
|TKO (punches)
|Rage in the Cage 178
|
|align=center|1
|align=center|0:31
|Prescott Valley, Arizona, United States
|
|-
|Win
|align=center|3–0
|Preston Harris
|Decision (unanimous)
|Rage in the Cage 176
|
|align=center|3
|align=center|5:00
|Phoenix, Arizona, United States
|
|-
|Win
|align=center|2–0
|Jeff Fletcher
|TKO (punches)
|World Fighting Federation 17
|
|align=center|2
|align=center|3:43
|Chandler, Arizona, United States
|
|-
|Win
|align=center|1–0
|Nolan McLaughlin
|TKO (punches)
|Duel for Domination 7
|
|align=center|1
|align=center|3:10
|Mesa, Arizona, United States
|
|-

References

External links

Living people
American male mixed martial artists
1988 births
Lightweight mixed martial artists
Mixed martial artists utilizing collegiate wrestling
Mixed martial artists utilizing Brazilian jiu-jitsu
Sportspeople from Kalamazoo, Michigan
Mixed martial artists from Michigan
Ultimate Fighting Championship male fighters
American male sport wrestlers
American practitioners of Brazilian jiu-jitsu